Sir Kenneth Henry Wheeler (7 September 1912 – 10 May 1996) was an Australian politician.

He was born in Mernda to farmer William Henry Wheeler and Alma Nellie Bodycoat. He worked on his father's farm from the age of thirteen, and then became a retail dairyman at Coburg in 1934. On 24 January 1934, he married Hazel Jean Collins, with whom he had two children. In 1950, he amalgamated his business with Croft Dairies, to form Metropolitan Dairies, of which he became manager in 1959.

A Liberal Party member, he served on Coburg City Council from 1950 to 1959 and was mayor from 1955 to 1956. In 1958, he was elected to the Victorian Legislative Assembly as the member for Essendon. He was elected Speaker of the Victorian Legislative Assembly in 1973, and was knighted in 1976. Wheeler retired from politics in 1979, and died in 1996.

References

1912 births
1996 deaths
Liberal Party of Australia members of the Parliament of Victoria
Members of the Victorian Legislative Assembly
Speakers of the Victorian Legislative Assembly
Australian Knights Bachelor
20th-century Australian politicians
People from the City of Whittlesea
Politicians from Melbourne